Laura Micheli (born 21 April 1931) is an Italian gymnast. She competed in the women's artistic team all-around at the 1948 Summer Olympics.

References

External links
 

1931 births
Living people
Italian female artistic gymnasts
Olympic gymnasts of Italy
Gymnasts at the 1948 Summer Olympics
Sportspeople from Trieste